Alnus Peak is located on the Canadian provincial boundary between Alberta and British Columbia. It was named in 1921 by Arthur O. Wheeler; alnus is the Latin name of the Alder tree. The name may refer to the dense stands of Red Alder found in the area.

See also
List of peaks on the Alberta–British Columbia border
List of mountains of Alberta
Mountains of British Columbia

References

Alnus Peakw
Alnus Peak
Canadian Rockies
Kootenay Land District